Christopher Shanahan (born 18 September 1960) is a Senior Counsel barrister in the state of Western Australia. He works primarily in the areas of superior court appeals, equity and administrative law.

He was educated at Aquinas College, Perth, University of Western Australia, University of Sydney and the University of New South Wales. He completed his articles with Jackson MacDonald in 1983. He was admitted to practise in the state of Western Australia in 1984, New South Wales in 1989 and in the High Court of Australia in 1990.

From 1990-91 he was Senior Officer to the Department of Prime Minister and Cabinet. During 1993, he joined the Western Australian Bar Association and continued to work as a barrister. He was responsible for the development of the Bar Readers' Course, which was presented in 2004 by the Western Australian Bar Association.

During his career he has taught at Macquarie University in Sydney, been a lecturer at Murdoch University in Perth, where he continues to work part-time lecturing in law. He also lectures Ethics and Professional Responsibility with the Law Society of Western Australia.

In 2004, he was appointed senior counsel in the state of Western Australia. During 2005, he was appointed acting commissioner of the Corruption and Crime Commission in Western Australia.

References/External links 
 Acting-CCC Profile - Christopher Shanahan
 Supreme Court of Western Australia Media Release
 Lionel Murphy Scholarship Recipient

References

1960 births
Living people
Australian Senior Counsel
People educated at Aquinas College, Perth
University of New South Wales alumni